Labdia semicoccinea is a moth of the family Cosmopterigidae. It is found in Japan,  Taiwan, Java, India, China and the Caucasus. It is an introduced species in parts of Europe.

The wingspan is 12–15 mm.

The larvae feed on Cajanus indicus, Polyscias, Zamis and Prunus donarium. They live in the stems of their host plant.

References

Moths described in 1859
Labdia
Moths of Japan